Shennong Bencaojing (also Classic of the Materia Medica or Shen-nong's Herbal Classics and Shen-nung Pen-tsao Ching) is a Chinese book on agriculture and medicinal plants, traditionally attributed to Shennong. Researchers believe the text is a compilation of oral traditions, written between about 206 BC and 220 AD. The original text no longer exists, but is said to have been composed of three volumes containing 365 entries on medicaments and their description.

Content
The first volume of the treatise included 120 drugs harmless to humans, the "stimulating properties": lingzhi, ginseng, jujube, the orange, Chinese cinnamon, Eucommia bark, cannabis, or the root of liquorice (Glycyrrhiza uralensis) .  These herbs are described as "noble" or "upper herbs".

The second volume is devoted to 120 therapeutic substances intended to treat the sick, but have toxic, or potentially toxic properties of varying degrees.  In this category are ginger, peonies and cucumber.  The substances of this group are described as "human", "commoner", or "middle herbs".

In the last volume there are 125 entries corresponding to substances which have a strong or violent action on physiological functions and are often poisonous. Rhubarb, different pitted fruits and peaches are among those featured.  These herbs are referred to as "low herbs".

See also
 Shanghan lun, a forerunner text to the Ben Cao Jing composed by Zhang Zhongjing

References

Bibliography

 
 
 

Chinese medical texts
Han dynasty texts
Herbalism
Traditional Chinese medicine
3rd-century books